Gaurav Bora (born 13 July 1998) is an Indian professional footballer who plays as a defender for Indian Super League club NorthEast United.

Club career
Born in Guwahati, Assam, Bora moved with his family to Delhi when he was younger. After playing for his school team, Bora was selected to be trained at the Baichung Bhutia Football School. Due to his good performance with the team, Bora was selected to represent the Delhi under-16 state team9 and was scouted to have a trial with Pune City. His trial was successful and Bora joined the Pune City Academy.

In November 2017, Bora was loaned to Chennai City of the I-League. He made his professional debut for the club on 29 November 2017 against Indian Arrows. He only played 26 minutes as Chennai City were defeated 3–0. After impressing the Chennai City coaching staff during the 2017–18 season, Bora was loaned back to the club the next season. During the 2018–19 season, Bora was moved by head coach Akbar Nawas from midfield to central defense, where he created a solid partnership with Roberto Eslava.

On 9 March 2019, Bora scored a brace in Chennai City's last match of the season against Minerva Punjab which helped the club win their first ever I-League title, and Bora's first trophy.

Odisha
On 27 June 2019, it was announced that Bora had joined Delhi Dynamos of the Indian Super League. Bora then made his debut for the re-branded club i.e. Odisha FC, on 22 December 2019 against Goa where he came on as a halftime substitute for Daniel Lalhlimpuia. The match eventually ended up as a 0–3 defeat for Odisha.

NorthEast United
On 25 August 2022, Gaurav joined Indian Super League club NorthEast United from Odisha for the upcoming season.

International
On 13 February 2019, Bora was called up to the India under-23 side which participated in the 2020 AFC U-23 Championship qualifiers. He made his debut for the side in their first match of the qualifiers against Uzbekistan U23. He played the whole match as India U23 were defeated 2–0 and eventually failed to qualify.

Career statistics

Club

Honours

Club
Chennai City
I-League: 2018–19

References

1998 births
Living people
Footballers from Assam
People from Delhi
Indian footballers
FC Pune City players
Chennai City FC players
Odisha FC players
NorthEast United FC players
Association football defenders
I-League players
Indian Super League players
India youth international footballers